Ronald Thomas Leeson (born 26 February 1939) is a former Australian politician who was a Labor Party member of the Legislative Council of Western Australia from 1971 to 1983, representing the South-East Province.

Leeson was born in Laverton (a remote Goldfields town) to Amelia May (née Lawer) and George Thomas Leeson. He attended Eastern Goldfields High School before going on to the Kalgoorlie School of Mines, and subsequently worked as a fitter and turner. From 1967 to 1972, he also served as secretary of the Amalgamated Engineering Union. Leeson was elected to parliament at the 1971 state election, replacing Jim Garrigan. He was re-elected to a second six-year term at the 1977 election. At the 1983 election, Leeson attempted to transfer to South Province, but was defeated by David Wordsworth (the sitting Liberal Party member). After leaving parliament, he was a committee member of the WA Greyhound Racing Board.

References

1939 births
Living people
Australian Labor Party members of the Parliament of Western Australia
Members of the Western Australian Legislative Council
People from Laverton, Western Australia
Australian trade unionists